The Ténéré Tree was a solitary acacia (Vachellia tortilis) that was once considered the most isolated tree on Earth, the only one for over . It was a landmark on caravan routes through the Ténéré region of the Sahara Desert in northeast Niger, so well known that it and the Arbre Perdu (Lost Tree) to the north are the only trees to be shown on a map at a scale of 1:4,000,000. It was knocked down in 1973 by a truck driver.

Background
The Tree of Ténéré was the last of a group of trees that grew when the desert was less parched than it is today. The tree had stood alone for decades. During the winter of 1938–1939 a well was dug near the tree and it was found that the roots of the tree reached the water table 33–36 meters (108 to 118 feet) below the surface.

Commander of the Allied Military Mission Michel Lesourd, of the  [Central service of Saharan affairs], saw the tree on May 21, 1939:

In his book , French ethnologist and explorer Henri Lhote described his two journeys to the Tree of Ténéré. His first visit was in 1934 on the occasion of the first automobile crossing between Djanet and Agadez. He describes the tree as "an Acacia with a degenerative trunk, sick or ill in aspect. Nevertheless, the tree has nice green leaves, and some yellow flowers". He visited it again 25 years later, on 26 November 1959 with the Berliet-Ténéré mission, but found that it had been badly damaged after a vehicle had collided with it:

Death and monument

The Tree of Ténéré was knocked down by a reportedly drunk truck driver in 1973. On November 8, 1973, the dead tree was moved to the Niger National Museum in the capital Niamey.

A simple metal sculpture representing the tree stands where the tree once grew.

In popular culture
The sculpture representing the Tree of Ténéré and the Tree's story feature prominently in the 2006 film La Gran final (The Great Match). In the film, a group of Tuareg nomads in the Sahara race to find a power supply and broadcast reception for their television in time to watch the 2002 FIFA World Cup Final between Germany and Brazil, eventually using the tree sculpture as a makeshift antenna.

In 2017, a group of artists created a massive, 4-story tall LED sculpture entitled Tree of Tenere that was showcased at Burning Man. The sculpture consisted of 25,000 molded leaves containing 175,000 LEDs.

In 2018, the tree's story has appeared as a main theme in the official music video of 'Transmission/Michaelion' by Ibeyi.

See also
 Dry tree
 List of individual trees

References

External links

 Photo Album of the Tenere Tree

Individual trees in Niger
Geography of Niger
Tuareg
Acacia
1970s individual tree deaths